Spodnja Jablanica (in older sources also Dolenja Jablanica) is a settlement in the Municipality of Šmartno pri Litiji in central Slovenia. It lies east of Šmartno in the valley of Jablanica Creek. The area is part of the historical region of Lower Carniola. The municipality is now included in the Central Slovenia Statistical Region.

References

External links
Spodnja Jablanica at Geopedia

Populated places in the Municipality of Šmartno pri Litiji